Corbu is a village in Dondușeni District, Moldova.

References

Villages of Dondușeni District